Samuel Theobald (October 23, 1872 – 1956) was an American painter. His work was part of the painting event in the art competition at the 1932 Summer Olympics.

References

1872 births
1956 deaths
20th-century American painters
American male painters
Olympic competitors in art competitions
People from Baltimore
20th-century American male artists